Spain competed at the 1966 European Athletics Championships in Budapest, Hungary, from 30 August to 4 September 1966.

Results

Men
Track & road events

Field events

Nations at the 1966 European Athletics Championships
1966
European Athletics Championships